New Zealand at the 1986 Commonwealth Games was represented by a team of 127 competitors and 45 officials. Selection of the team for the Games in Edinburgh, Scotland, was the responsibility of the New Zealand Olympic and Commonwealth Games Association. New Zealand's flagbearer at the opening ceremony was sculler Stephanie Foster. The New Zealand team finished fourth on the medal table, winning a total of 38 medals, eight of which were gold.

New Zealand has competed in every games, starting with the British Empire Games in 1930 at Hamilton, Ontario.

Medal tables

Competitors
The following table lists the number of New Zealand competitors participating at the Games according to gender and sport.

Athletics

Track and road

Field

Combined
Men's decathlon

Women's heptathlon

Badminton

Singles

Doubles

Teams

Boxing

Cycling

Road

Track
Men's 1000 m sprint

Men's 1 km time trial

Men's 4000 m pursuit

Men's 10 miles scratch race

Diving

Lawn bowls

Rowing

Shooting

Pistol

Rifle

Shotgun

Swimming

Synchronised swimming

Weightlifting

Wrestling

Officials

See also
New Zealand Olympic Committee 
New Zealand at the Commonwealth Games
New Zealand at the 1984 Summer Olympics
New Zealand at the 1988 Summer Olympics

References

External links
NZOC website on the 1986 games 
Commonwealth Games Federation website

1986
Nations at the 1986 Commonwealth Games
Commonwealth Games